Illinois Route 131 (IL 131) is a north–south state route in northeastern Illinois.

Route description 
It is one of very few state routes whose named road is longer than the marked state road. Green Bay Road actually continues south to Old Elm Road (Lake CR 52) while there is a second segment of Green Bay Road that starts at a dead end in Highwood and ends at Ridge Avenue in Evanston. The Green Bay Road name also stretches continuously through Racine County and Kenosha County, WI, with route signage changing to Wisconsin Highway 31, before merging with Wisconsin Highway 32 north of Racine. However, other large portions of the formerly continuous Green Bay Road still bear the name, such as Green Bay Avenue in Milwaukee and several Green Bay Road segments in Ozaukee County.  

The road parallels U.S. Route 41 (Skokie Highway), which is only a few miles to the west, and Illinois Route 137 (Amstutz Expressway), which is only a few miles to the east. It is the major north–south road between those two expressways.

History 
SBI Route 131 ran from Mattoon to Greenup in southeastern Illinois. This was dropped in 1937 for Illinois Route 121. The next year, Illinois 131 was used on a road that extended Highway 31 south into Illinois. This had formerly been Illinois Route 68. Had Illinois 31 not already been in use, the road south of Wisconsin may have been designated Illinois 31 instead.

Major Intersections

References

External links

131
Transportation in Lake County, Illinois